Liu Fangzhou was the defending champion, but chose to participate in Hua Hin instead.

Misa Eguchi won the title, defeating Hiroko Kuwata in an all-Japanese final, 7–6(7–5), 6–3.

Seeds

Main draw

Finals

Top half

Bottom half

References 
 Main draw

Bendigo Women's International - Singles